224th Brigade may refer to:
224th Mixed Brigade (Spain)
224th Brigade (United Kingdom)
224th Sustainment Brigade (United States)